Pardus Cycling Team is a UCI Continental team, based in Liaoning, China, that was founded in 2020.

Team roster

References

External links

UCI Continental Teams (Asia)
Cycling teams based in China
Cycling teams established in 2020